BiggerPockets is an American company based in Denver, Colorado. It focuses on real estate investing education and the benefits of investing in rental properties. The company has a website that offers tools and resources for real estate investors, including an online community with forums for residential real-estate investors. It also publishes podcasts and books about real estate investing.

The company's Chief Executive Officer is Scott Trench and Aaron Sallade serves as Chief Financial Officer.

History 
BiggerPockets was founded in 2004 by Joshua Dorkin. It was originally a message board for real estate investors to ask questions and share best practices. He started the company with no venture capital financing and no outside investment. Dorkin served as the CEO of BiggerPockets for 14 years. Their first employees were hired in 2013.

The company claims over 2.5 million members. As of March 2022, its online forums had 2 million members.

BiggerPockets coined the phrase “BRRRR” to describe a real estate investing strategy of Buy, Rehab, Rent, Refinance, Repeat. This is similar to the BRRR strategy but includes the additional “R” for Repeat.

In 2006, members of the BiggerPockets message board helped uncover fraud at Pinnacle Development Partners. That resulted in an SEC investigation and later shutdown of the firm after it was revealed to be a Ponzi scheme.

In 2016, the company had annual revenue of $7 million from advertising, memberships, and partnership income.

Podcasts 
The BiggerPockets podcast was launched in 2013 by company founder Josh Dorkin. In March 2022, it was the top real estate investing podcast.

In February 2023, the company claimed over 161 million total podcast downloads. BiggerPockets shows include:

 BiggerPockets Real Estate Podcast
 BiggerPockets Money Podcast
 On the Market
 Rookie Podcast
 InvestHER Podcast

Books 
Their publishing department, BiggerPockets Publishing, has published several books, including:

 How to Invest in Real Estate: The Ultimate Beginner's Guide to Getting Started
 Buy, Rehab, Rent, Refinance, Repeat: The BRRRR Rental Property Investment Strategy Made Simple

References 

Companies based in Denver
Residential real estate
Audio podcasts
American brands